Miscellaneous Symbols is a Unicode block (U+2600–U+26FF) containing glyphs representing concepts from a variety of categories: astrological, astronomical, chess, dice, musical notation, political symbols, recycling, religious symbols, trigrams, warning signs, and weather, among others.

Tables

Compact table

Definitions

Emoji
The Miscellaneous Symbols block contains 83 emoji:
U+2600–U+2604, U+260E, U+2611, U+2614–U+2615, U+2618, U+261D, U+2620, U+2622–U+2623, U+2626, U+262A, U+262E–U+262F, U+2638–U+263A, U+2640, U+2642, U+2648–U+2653, U+265F–U+2660, U+2663, U+2665–U+2666, U+2668, U+267B, U+267E–U+267F, U+2692–U+2697, U+2699, U+269B–U+269C, U+26A0–U+26A1, U+26A7, U+26AA–U+26AB, U+26B0–U+26B1, U+26BD–U+26BE, U+26C4–U+26C5, U+26C8, U+26CE–U+26CF, U+26D1, U+26D3–U+26D4, U+26E9–U+26EA, U+26F0–U+26F5, U+26F7–U+26FA and U+26FD.

The block has 164 standardized variants defined to specify emoji-style (U+FE0F VS16) or text presentation (U+FE0E VS15) for the
following 82 base characters: U+2600–U+2604, U+260E, U+2611, U+2614–U+2615, U+2618, U+261D, U+2620, U+2622–U+2623, U+2626, U+262A, U+262E–U+262F, U+2638–U+263A, U+2640, U+2642, U+2648–U+2653, U+265F–U+2660, U+2663, U+2665–U+2666, U+2668, U+267B, U+267E–U+267F, U+2692–U+2697, U+2699, U+269B–U+269C, U+26A0–U+26A1, U+26A7, U+26AA–U+26AB, U+26B0–U+26B1, U+26BD–U+26BE, U+26C4–U+26C5, U+26C8, U+26CF, U+26D1, U+26D3–U+26D4, U+26E9–U+26EA, U+26F0–U+26F5, U+26F7–U+26FA and U+26FD.

Emoji modifiers

The Miscellaneous Symbols block has two emoji that represent people or body parts.
They can be modified using U+1F3FB–U+1F3FF to provide for a range of human skin color using the Fitzpatrick scale:

Additional human emoji can be found in other Unicode blocks: Dingbats, Emoticons, Miscellaneous Symbols and Pictographs, Supplemental Symbols and Pictographs, Symbols and Pictographs Extended-A and Transport and Map Symbols.

History
In Unicode 1.0 (1991) the same block was named Miscellaneous Dingbats (not to be confused with current "Dingbats" block, which was then named "Zapf Dingbats").

The following Unicode-related documents record the purpose and process of defining specific characters in the Miscellaneous Symbols block:

See also
 Unicode Symbols
 Apple Symbols – typeface that supports this character set.
 Astronomical symbols
 Cultural, political, and religious symbols in Unicode
 Wingdings
 Semi graphical characters

References

External links

 
 

Unicode blocks
Unicode blocks with characters for games
Computer-related introductions in 1990
Emoji